Pseudepapterus is a genus of driftwood catfishes found in tropical South America.

Species
There are three described species in this genus:
 Pseudepapterus cucuhyensis J. E. Böhlke, 1951
 Pseudepapterus gracilis Ferraris & Vari, 2000
 Pseudepapterus hasemani (Steindachner, 1915)

References
 

Auchenipteridae
Catfish genera
Taxa named by Franz Steindachner